Julieta Monica Ramírez (born 5 July 1974) is an Argentine rower. She competed in the women's coxless pair event at the 1996 Summer Olympics.

References

External links
 

1974 births
Living people
Argentine female rowers
Olympic rowers of Argentina
Rowers at the 1996 Summer Olympics
Place of birth missing (living people)
Pan American Games bronze medalists for Argentina
Medalists at the 1995 Pan American Games
Rowers at the 1995 Pan American Games
Pan American Games medalists in rowing
20th-century Argentine women